Triumph is the debut studio album by Canadian hard rock band Triumph, released in 1976. The album was remastered and re-released with a new cover and name in 1995 called In the Beginning (then remastered again in 2005).

Track listing

Personnel
Triumph
 Rik Emmett – guitars, synthesizers, vocals
 Gil Moore  – drums, vocals
 Michael Levine – bass, keyboards
Additional personnel
 Laurie Delgrande – keyboards
 James SK Wān – bamboo flute

Production
 Doug Hill – producer
 Brian Bell – engineer, mixing
 George Semkiw – remixing
 Mick Walsh – assistant
 Mark Wright – assistant
 Scott Hull – digital mastering
 Darko – photography, digital design, cover photo
 Brett Zilahi – digital remastering

Certifications

References

External links
In The Beginning entry at the Official Triumph Homepage

Triumph (band) albums
1976 debut albums
Albums produced by Mike Levine (musician)